Vijñānabhikṣu (also spelled Vijnanabhikshu) was a Hindu philosopher from Bihar, variously dated to the 15th or 16th century, known for his commentary on various schools of Hindu philosophy, particularly the Yoga text of Patanjali. His scholarship stated that there is a unity between Vedānta, Yoga, and Samkhya philosophies, and he is considered a significant influence on Neo-Vedanta movement of the modern era.

Philosophy
He wrote commentaries in the 15th century on three different schools of Indian philosophy, Vedānta, Sāṃkhya, and Yoga, and integrated them into a nondualism platform that belongs to both the Bhedabheda and Advaita (nondualism) sub-schools of Vedanta. According to Andrew Nicholson, this became the basis of Neo-Vedanta. His integration is known as Avibhaga Advaita ("indistinguishable non-dualism"). His sub-commentary on the Yoga Sutras, the Yogavarttika, has been an influential work.

According to Andrew Fort, Vijnanabhiksu's commentary is Yogic Advaita, since his commentary is suffused with Advaita-influenced Samkhya-Yoga. Vijnanabhiksu discusses, adds Fort, a spiritually liberated person as a yogic jivanmukta.

Influence
Nicholson mentions Vijnanabhiksu as a prime influence on 19th century Indology and the formation of Neo-Vedanta. According to Nicholson, already between the twelfth and the sixteenth century,

The tendency of "a blurring of philosophical distinctions" has also been noted by Mikel Burley. Lorenzen locates the origins of a distinct Hindu identity in the interaction between Muslims and Hindus, and a process of "mutual self-definition with a contrasting Muslim other", which started well before 1800. Both the Indian and the European thinkers who developed the term "Hinduism" in the 19th century were influenced by these philosophers.

Works
Little good work has been written in English on Vijñānabhikṣu, and most of the texts in his large corpus have yet to be edited and published in Sanskrit, let alone translated into English.

Major works
Some major texts attributed to Vijnanabhiksu include:
 Vijnanamritabhashya ("The Nectar of Knowledge Commentary", commentary on Badarayana's Brahma Sutras)
 Ishvaragitabhashya ("Commentary on the Ishvara Gita")
 Sankhyasara ("Quintessence of the Sankhya")
 Sankhyasutrabhashya ("Commentary on the Sankhya Sutras" of Kapila)
 Yogasarasamgraha ("Compendium on the Quintessence of Yoga")
 Yogabhashyavarttika ("Explanation of the Commentary on the Yoga Sutras" of Vyasa)

English translations
 Ganganatha Jha, Yogasarasamgraha of Vijnanabhiksu, New Delhi: Parimal Publications, 1995.
 José Pereira, Hindu Theology: A Reader, Garden City: Doubleday, 1976. Includes translated excerpts from Vijnanamritabhashya and Sankhyasutrabhashya.
 T. S. Rukmani, Yogavarttika of Vijnanabhiksu, New Delhi: Munshiram Manoharlal, 1981.
 Nandalal Sinha, The Samkhya Philosophy, New Delhi: Oriental Books Reprint Corporation, 1979.  Contains a complete translation of Vijnanabhikshu's Sankhyasutrabhashya.
 Shiv Kumar, Samkhyasara of Vijnanabhiksu, Delhi: Eastern Book Linkers, 1988.

See also
 Unifying Hinduism (book)

References

Sources

 
 
 
 
 Daniel P. Sheridan, "Vijnanabhikshu", in Great Thinkers of the Eastern World'', Ian McGready, ed., New York: Harper Collins, 1995, pp. 248–251.

External links
 A General Idea of  Philosophy, Surendranath Dasgupta, 1940
 Chapter one of Vijnanabhiksu's Ishvaragitabhashya (Sanskrit only; PDF Format).

16th-century Indian philosophers
16th-century births
17th-century deaths